Magdalena "Magda" Fronczewska (born October 30, 1978) is Polish former child singer.

Fronczewska started singing around the age of 8–9. At first, she accompanied popular Polish singer for children Majka Jeżowska, but soon had her own songs, written mostly by Jacek Cygan, a well known in Polish songwriter. Some of them appeared on Fronczewska's album WOW in 1990. Some of her songs became a part of "Dyskoteka Pana Jacka" series of concerts and music albums for children. In 1986, Magda made a cameo appearance in Podróże Pana Kleksa movie and was a guest of many TV and radio programs for children.

In 1997, Fronczewska tried to restart  her career as an adult but was unsuccessful and has not appeared publicly since then.

Family
Fronczewska's father is popular actor Piotr Fronczewski. Her sister, Katarzyna "Kasia" Fronczewska was also a child singer. They accompanied Majka Jeżowska at the same time, but Kasia never tried to continue a solo career. She also appeared in Podróże Pana Kleksa, as well as guest-appeared in an episode of TV show 07 zgłoś się.

Sources
 Profile at filmpolski.pl
 Fronczewska's concert on YouTube
 "Wow" and other songs on YouTube
 Dyskoteka Pana Jacka 2 on YouTube

1978 births
Living people
Polish child singers
Polish people of Jewish descent
Musicians from Warsaw
20th-century Polish women singers
21st-century Polish women singers
21st-century Polish singers